The 1954 Penn State Nittany Lions football team represented the Pennsylvania State University in the 1954 college football season. The team was coached by Rip Engle and played its home games in New Beaver Field in University Park, Pennsylvania.

Schedule

References

Penn State
Penn State Nittany Lions football seasons
Penn State Nittany Lions football